Eleonoro Pacello (9 January 1643 – May 1695) was a Roman Catholic prelate who served as Bishop of Pula (1689–1695).

Biography
Eleonoro Pacello was born in Vicence, Italy.
On 16 Jun 1669, he was ordained as a priest and on 7 Nov 1689, he was appointed by Pope Alexander VIII as Bishop of Pula. 
He served as Bishop of Pula until his death in May 1695.

See also 
Catholic Church in Italy

References

External links and additional sources
 (for Chronology of Bishops) 
 (for Chronology of Bishops) 

17th-century Roman Catholic bishops in Croatia
1643 births
1695 deaths
Bishops appointed by Pope Alexander VIII